Osage is an unincorporated community in Monongalia County, West Virginia, United States.  It lies across the Monongahela River from Morgantown.

The community was named after the Osage Indians.

References

Morgantown metropolitan area
Unincorporated communities in Monongalia County, West Virginia
Unincorporated communities in West Virginia
Coal towns in West Virginia